Bernhard Bentgens (born 1 November 1956 in Duisburg) is a German composer, conductor, singer-songwriter, choirmaster, and conférencier (humorous moderator in variety shows, cabarets, revues, shows, television or radio programs).

Life and work 
In 1981 Bentgens graduated from the Folkwang University of the Arts in Essen-Werden with a Staatsexamen (German master's degree). His main subjects were piano, organ, vocals, choral and orchestral conducting. From 1981 to 1983 he worked as a musician in the orchestra of the National Theater Mannheim. Between 1982 and 1984 Bernhard Bentgens concluded his musicological studies with Ludwig Finscher in Heidelberg and Alexander Ringer in Illinois. In 1984, he appeared with his first solo program for which, in the same year, he received the cabaret prize of Baden-Württemberg. Over the next five years Bernhard Bentgens worked as musical director of incidental music at the Heidelberg City Theatre. In 1987 to 1992, he received a lectureship at the University of Applied Sciences Heidelberg.

After 1989 he worked as a freelance composer for theater, television and radio at home and abroad. Since the same year Bentgens conducts the Heidelberg HardChor and 1. FC Heidelberg. With the clown trio "Extra Nix" he toured in the 90's together with Rosemie Warth and Thomas Nigl at renowned festival stages in Europe and Canada. During this time he worked with various orchestras, such as the Stuttgart Philharmonic, the orchestra of the Hessian radio, the Saarland Radio Orchestra, the Symphony Orchestra of Freiburg and Hamburg Symphony Orchestra and composed the music for the German TV series 'Der Plakatierer' (literally The Placarder).

Bernhard Bentgens worked as a presenter at galas and symphony concerts from the 90s. Since 1992 he is part of the main cast of a monthly live radio show Zungenschlag in Heidelberg. There followed various radio productions. Together with Roger Back he organizes the chanson festival Schoener Luegen since 2001. Since 2005 he has been the conductor of a choir consisting of mothers and fathers, "The Mamas and Papas"of the English Institute in Heidelberg. 2007 he founded with his wife Julia Bentgens the Metropolitan International School with Nurseries, Kindergartens, Primary und Secondary School and a Boarding House. In 2014 Bentgens founded the "Beschwerdechor/Besserwerdechor" in Heidelberg.

Awards 
 1984: Mannheim Kleinkunstpreis
 1984: "Terpsichore" (Baden-Württemberg Kleinkunstpreis)
 1993: Special Jury Prize at the Charlie Rivel-Memorial, Barcelona, with Extra-Nix
 1993: Third prize at "Printemps Des Courges"Clown – Festival, Toulouse, with Extra-Nix
 1996: Cabaret Award Baden-Württemberg (1st prize)

Programs, CDs and Books 
 1984 Solo program "Unterwasserlieder"
 1988 Solo program "Musenfrust"
 1995 CD "Bentgens. Lieder für Hirn, Herz und Bauch" 
 1995 Program "Concert in 3D"
 1997 CD "Bentgens live"
 1998 CD "Bentgens plus live"
 2000 Program and CD with tape "Hallo Zukunft"
 2001 Musical "Ob sich das Herz zum Herzen findet" 
 2001 Solo program "Fühl-Vergnügen" 
 2003 Musical "Oh, dass sie ewig grünen bliebe"  
 2003 Solo program "Buddha bei den Fischen" 
 2005 CD "Lametta im Bikini"
 2006 CD "Sing im Unsing" 
 2007 Program "Mama Mia" with Maria Bentgens
 2012 Program and CD (2015) "Bentgens und die 3 Musiktiere" ("Bentgens and the three musceteers") with Peter Antony, Tom Beisel, Bernhard Heuvelmann and Peter Saueressig
 2014 Event series "Schwarmsingen" in the Halle02 in Heidelberg
 2016 Two volumes chamber music „Musik für Geige“ and „Musik für Klavier“
 2016 CD „Jenseits von Norden und Süden“
 2017 CD „Sieben“
 2018 Two books „Gedichte1“ and „Blötschkopp“ (Prosa)
 2019 Premiere of „Circus inclusioni“ with Beschwerdechor
 2020 Book „Magier der Sinne, Poet der Leidenschaft“ 222 Songs of Bernhard Bentgens

References

External links 
 Homepage of Bernhard Bentgens
 Music publisher of Bernhard Bentgens
 Zungenschlag
 Chanson festival "Schoener Luegen"
 Metropolitan International School

1956 births
20th-century German male singers
Living people
21st-century German male singers
People from Duisburg